Ángeles Barreiro (born 26 July 1963) is a Spanish athlete. She competed in the women's discus throw at the 1992 Summer Olympics.

References

External links
 

1963 births
Living people
Athletes (track and field) at the 1992 Summer Olympics
Spanish female discus throwers
Olympic athletes of Spain
Place of birth missing (living people)